Arad Hospital is a private general hospital, founded in 1976, in the center of Tehran, Iran. It has 150 beds in 5 floors with more than 45 intensive care beds (general ICU (10), SICU (10), RICU (10), MICU (10) and CCU (10)). The hospital is fully equipped with all types of specialities and subspecialties. Arad Hospital is run by 120 staff personnel in various fields of medicine. The hospital's stated purpose is "to continue to build on the best of the distinguished tradition of the past to meet the ever-changing patterns of medical care in future."

References

External links
 Teheran hospitals
 

Hospital buildings completed in 1976
Private hospitals in Iran
Hospitals established in 1980
Buildings and structures in Tehran